Roy Denzil Hibbert (born December 11, 1986) is a Jamaican-American former professional basketball player. He is a two-time NBA All-Star, and earned NBA All-Defensive Second Team honors in 2014. Hibbert was the runner-up for the NBA Defensive Player of the Year Award in the 2013-14 NBA season, placing second behind Joakim Noah.

Hibbert played college basketball for the Georgetown Hoyas and was named a consensus second-team All-American as a senior in 2008. He was drafted 17th overall in the 2008 NBA draft by the Toronto Raptors and was subsequently traded to the Indiana Pacers on draft night. Hibbert has represented the Jamaica national team in international competition, being eligible because of his dual U.S. and Jamaican citizenship.

Early life
Hibbert was born in Queens, New York City to Roy, Sr. and Patty Hibbert. His father is originally from Jamaica and his mother from Trinidad. The family moved to Adelphi, Maryland when Roy was two. Around that time, the New York Post states, his parents introduced him to basketball after they had "tried to get him to play tennis, then golf, then the piano".

College career

Hibbert was named to the All-Big East Second Team in 2006 along with teammate Jeff Green. In 2007, he and Green were unanimous selections to the All-Big East First Team, with Green earning Big East Player of the Year honors. The two led the Hoyas to victory in the 2007 Big East Conference Championship for the first time since 1989 against the Pittsburgh Panthers; Hibbert contributed a double-double with 18 points and 11 rebounds. Before the 2007–08 season he was named Big East's preseason player of the year. He was also named a pre-season All-American along with the likes of Tyler Hansbrough, whose North Carolina Tar Heels were upset by Hibbert's Hoyas in the Elite Eight of the 2007 NCAA Tournament.

Hibbert had repeatedly said that he planned to play all four years and graduate from Georgetown, continuing the tradition of graduating Hoya centers such as Patrick Ewing, Alonzo Mourning and Dikembe Mutombo. However, his performance in helping to lead the Hoyas to the 2007 Final Four catapulted him into lottery pick status. Hibbert declared his eligibility for the 2007 NBA draft, but did not sign with an agent. On May 23, 2007, Hibbert announced he would return to school for his senior season. Hibbert said of Georgetown, "My heart was here. ... I feel like I have unfinished business here." Following the Hoyas' upset loss to Davidson and Stephen Curry in the second round of the 2008 NCAA Tournament, Hibbert's collegiate career came to a close.

In college, Hibbert was often referred to as the "Big Stiff" from reporters and fans.

Professional career

Indiana Pacers (2008–2015)

Hibbert was drafted 17th overall by the Toronto Raptors in the 2008 NBA draft. On July 9, 2008, his rights were traded to the Indiana Pacers for Jermaine O'Neal. On July 15, he signed his first professional contract with the Pacers.

Hibbert was selected to the 2012 NBA All-Star Game as a reserve for the East. He played 10 minutes and scored 3 points, going 1–3 from the field. In Game 1 of the first round of the 2012 NBA Playoffs against the Orlando Magic, Hibbert recorded 9 blocks.

 
On July 13, 2012, Hibbert re-signed with the Pacers on a reported four-year, $58 million contract. On November 21, 2012, Hibbert set a career high by recording 11 blocks as part of a 10 point/11 rebound/11 block triple-double in a victory against the New Orleans Hornets. The 11 blocks also broke the franchise record for most blocks in a single game, and Hibbert became only the second player in Pacers history (alongside Jermaine O'Neal) to record a points-rebounds-blocks triple-double.

In Game 3 of a 2013 Eastern Conference Semifinals series against the New York Knicks, Hibbert recorded 24 points and 12 rebounds in a Pacers win. In Game 6, Hibbert recorded 25 points and 12 rebounds, along with 5 blocks, including a significant block on Carmelo Anthony, which led the Pacers to the 2013 Eastern Conference Finals. Hibbert averaged 15.8 points and 3.8 blocks in this series. During the post-game press conference after Game 6 of the 2013 Eastern Conference Finals against the Miami Heat, Hibbert used the term "no homo" and later was fined $75,000 by the NBA for the remark. Hibbert apologized for his comments in a statement released by the Pacers: "I am apologizing for insensitive remarks made during the post-game press conference after our victory over Miami Saturday night", he said. "They were disrespectful and offensive and not a reflection of my personal views. I used a slang term that is not appropriate in any setting, private or public, and the language I used definitely has no place in a public forum, especially over live television. I apologize to those who I have offended, to our fans and to the Pacers' organization."

Hibbert was selected as an All-Star reserve for the East in 2014. He played 12 minutes and tallied 8 points on 4–5 shooting. At the end of the season, Hibbert finished second in the Defensive Player of the Year voting with 166 out of the 1125, losing to Joakim Noah, who had 555 of the points. Hibbert averaged 2.2 blocks per game. During the 2014 NBA playoffs, Hibbert went scoreless in games 5 and 6 of the Pacers' first round match against the eighth seed, Atlanta Hawks. Hibbert was the second All-Star to ever go scoreless in consecutive games in the playoffs, the first being Jim King in 1968. Hibbert would also have scoreless games in Game 1 of the semifinals (against the Washington Wizards) and in Game 4 of the conference finals (against the Miami Heat). By the end of the 2014 postseason, Hibbert had four scoreless postseason games, setting an NBA record for most scoreless NBA postseason games by a current All-Star. Hibbert's season ended in the Eastern Conference Finals as the Pacers were eliminated by the Miami Heat in 6 games.

On June 29, 2015, Hibbert exercised his player option with the Pacers for the 2015–16 season.

Los Angeles Lakers (2015–2016)

On July 9, 2015, Hibbert was traded to the Los Angeles Lakers in exchange for a second-round pick in the 2019 NBA Draft. He made his debut for the Lakers in their season opener on October 28, 2015, recording 12 points and 10 rebounds in a 112–111 loss to the Minnesota Timberwolves. Hibbert appeared in 81 of 82 games, all of which he started. However, his points per game average (5.9) was the lowest of his career. His blocks, rebounds and minutes per game were all the lowest since his rookie year.

Charlotte Hornets (2016–2017)
On July 7, 2016, Hibbert signed with the Charlotte Hornets. He made his debut for the Hornets in their season opener on October 26, 2016, recording 15 points and nine rebounds in a 107–96 win over the Milwaukee Bucks. Hibbert came into the Hornets' game against the Portland Trail Blazers on January 18, 2017 averaging 5.2 points per game. He subsequently had a season-high 16 points on 7-of-8 shooting in a 107–85 win over Portland.

Denver Nuggets (2017)
On February 2, 2017, Hibbert was traded, along with Spencer Hawes, to the Milwaukee Bucks in exchange for Miles Plumlee. However, before appearing in a game for the Bucks, he was traded again, this time to the Denver Nuggets on February 23 in exchange for a protected 2019 second-round draft pick. The Nuggets renounced their free agent exception rights on Hibbert during the subsequent offseason, making him an unrestricted free agent.

On July 17, 2018, Hibbert announced his retirement.

Coaching career

Philadelphia 76ers (2019–present)
On August 9, 2019, it was reported that Hibbert was hired by the Philadelphia 76ers as a player development associate.

National team career
In the summer of 2007, Hibbert was the starting center on the U.S. team, which was composed of college players, at the 2007 Pan-American Games. In 2008, he began representing the Jamaica national team. He has dual U.S. and Jamaican citizenship due to his father. He was named captain of the team in 2010 and represented them in the 2010 Centrobasket.

Personal life
Hibbert appeared as a guest star playing himself on three episodes of the comedy series Parks and Recreation. He also appeared in an episode of The Eric Andre Show.

NBA career statistics

Regular season

|-
| style="text-align:left;"| 
| style="text-align:left;"| Indiana
| 69 || 42 || 14.4 || .471 || .000 || .667 || 3.5 || .7 || .3 || 1.1 || 7.1
|-
| style="text-align:left;"| 
| style="text-align:left;"| Indiana
| 81 || 69 || 25.1 || .495 || .500 || .754 || 5.7 || 2.0 || .4 || 1.6 || 11.7
|-
| style="text-align:left;"| 
| style="text-align:left;"| Indiana
| 81 || 80 || 27.7 || .461 || .000 || .745 || 7.5 || 2.0 || .4 || 1.8 || 12.7
|-
| style="text-align:left;"| 
| style="text-align:left;"| Indiana
| 65 || 65 || 29.8 || .497 || .000 || .711 || 8.8 || 1.7 || .5 || 2.0 || 12.8
|-
| style="text-align:left;"| 
| style="text-align:left;"| Indiana
| 79 || 79 || 28.7 || .448 || .250 || .741 || 8.3 || 1.4 || .5 || 2.6 || 11.9
|-
| style="text-align:left;"| 
| style="text-align:left;"| Indiana
| 81 || 81 || 29.7 || .439 || .400 || .770 || 6.6 || 1.1 || .4 || 2.2 || 10.8
|-
| style="text-align:left;"| 
| style="text-align:left;"| Indiana
| 76 || 76 || 25.3 || .446 || .000 || .824 || 7.1 || 1.1 || .2 || 1.6 || 10.6
|- 
| style="text-align:left;"| 
| style="text-align:left;"| L.A. Lakers
| 81 || 81 || 23.2 || .443 || .000 || .807 || 4.9 || 1.2 || .4 || 1.4 || 5.9
|-
| style="text-align:left;"| 
| style="text-align:left;"| Charlotte
| 42 || 13 || 16.0 || .542 || .000 || .813 || 3.6 || .5 || .2 || 1.0 || 5.2
|-
| style="text-align:left;"| 
| style="text-align:left;"| Denver
| 6 || 0 || 1.8 || .667 || .000 || .000 || .3 || .2 || .0 || .3 || .7
|- class="sortbottom"
| style="text-align:center;" colspan="2"| Career
| 662 || 586 || 24.8 || .465 || .250 || .755 || 6.3 || 1.3 || .4 || 1.7 || 10.0
|- class="sortbottom"
| style="text-align:center;" colspan="2"| All-Star
| 2 || 0 || 11.0 || .625 || .000 || 1.000 || 4.0 || 1.5 || .0 || .0 || 5.5

Playoffs

|-
| style="text-align:left;"| 2011
| style="text-align:left;"| Indiana
| 5 || 5 || 26.4 || .444 || .000 || .706 || 6.8 || .6 || .4 || 1.8 || 10.4
|-
| style="text-align:left;"| 2012
| style="text-align:left;"| Indiana
| 11 || 11 || 30.9 || .500 || 1.000 || .667 || 11.2 || 1.1 || .4 || 3.1 || 11.7
|-
| style="text-align:left;"| 2013
| style="text-align:left;"| Indiana
| 19 || 19 || 36.5 || .511 || .000 || .806 || 9.9 || 1.4 || .2 || 1.9 || 17.0
|-
| style="text-align:left;"| 2014
| style="text-align:left;"| Indiana
| 19 || 19 || 28.5 || .449 || .000 || .772 || 5.5 || .9 || .2 || 1.4 || 9.3
|- class="sortbottom"
| style="text-align:center;" colspan="2"| Career
| 54 || 54 || 31.6 || .486 || .500 || .765 || 8.3 || 1.1 || .2 || 2.0 || 12.6

See also

 List of National Basketball Association players with most blocks in a game

References

Further reading
 Jordan Conn, "The Roy Hibbert Project: How the Indiana Pacers' All-Star Center Avoided Becoming a Stiff", Grantland.com, May 2, 2012.
 Tim Davenport, "Hibbertmania!" Pinwheel Empire, July 8, 2012.

External links

Georgetown Hoyas bio

1986 births
Living people
All-American college men's basketball players
American men's basketball players
American sportspeople of Jamaican descent
American sportspeople of Trinidad and Tobago descent
Basketball players at the 2007 Pan American Games
Basketball players from Maryland
Basketball players from New York City
Basketball players from Washington, D.C.
Centers (basketball)
Charlotte Hornets players
Denver Nuggets players
Georgetown Hoyas men's basketball players
Georgetown Preparatory School alumni
Indiana Pacers players
Jamaican men's basketball players
Jamaican people of Trinidad and Tobago descent
Los Angeles Lakers players
National Basketball Association All-Stars
People from Adelphi, Maryland
People from Bethesda, Maryland
Sportspeople from Montgomery County, Maryland
Sportspeople from Queens, New York
Toronto Raptors draft picks
Pan American Games competitors for the United States